Sagar Sen (15 May 1932 – 4 January 1983) was a Bengali singer. Though primarily known as an exemplary Rabindrasangeet artiste, he had recorded numerous Bengali modern songs and directed a few as well.

Career 

Born 15 May 1932 in a zamindar family of Rajbari, Faridpur district in erstwhile East Bengal, Sagar Sen was the youngest son of Bijon Behari Sen and Noyonmanjari Sen. Though his early childhood was spent in what is now Bangladesh, his entire musical career spanning more than 2½ decades mostly based out of Kolkata, West Bengal, India.

In his early days, Sagar Sen showed remarkable range and depth, a prodigious ability to convey complex emotions as a singer, impressing audiences through his local performances and building up a strong following. His songs were first broadcast on All India Radio (AIR) Akashvani, Kolkata in 1958. Frequent live AIR broadcasts of his renditions through the following decades became the listening staple of his ardent fans and followers. The legend cut his first album in 1961 under the Megaphone Records label with record topping songs Nupuro Bejey Jaye and Ogo Joler Rani.

In 1962, the legend founded the Rabi Rashmi, a Tagorean music academy. The project registered student enrolment in the thousands and garnered a manifold increase in the number of his ardent followers. His singles Apnake Ei Jana Amar and Keno Aamaye Pagol Kore Jaas under the Columbia record label were released in 1964 followed by the release of the songs Oei Malatilata Doley and Aamaar Nayano Tabo Nayaner under the same label. He participated in the recordings of Tagore's operas namely, Shap Mochan (1966) and Valmiki Pratibha (1967).

1968, the defining year of Sagar Sen’s musical journey, saw the release of his cult single Ami Jene Shune Bish Korechhi Paan, a song from Tagore’s first operatic ballad Mayar Khela, under the EMI record label. Jene Shune Bish instantaneously transported Sagar Sen to luminous heights; his dizzying fame transformed Rabi Rashmi to a living institution; the most coveted by students of Tagorean music and adored by music lovers & aficionados. A legend was born.

His first stereophonic Long Play (LP) record comprising 12 Tagore songs, 6 each from 'Puja' (Devotional) and 'Prem' (Love) category was released in the year 1974 under the EMI-HMV record label. Through the decades, the legend’s innumerable Rabindrasangeet renditions that were regularly broadcast live by the AIR and Akashvani, now find place in their archival collections. His solo recitals were beamed live during the inaugural broadcasts of the Kolkata Doordarshan in August 1975, the first live television broadcast in Bengali; he featured in several subsequent broadcasts of the Doordarshan. Throughout the 1970s and early 1980s he recorded numerous songs with the erstwhile Gramophone Company of India Ltd.

In 1979, the BFJA, a premier cinematic award was conferred upon him for best playback singing of the Tagore song Aaj Jyotsnaratey Shobai Gechhey Boney in the film Parichay; it was the first time that anyone had won a Bengal film award by singing Rabindrasangeet in a film playback track.

Sagar Sen’s unique understanding & spiritual insight of Tagore's songs has been invariably watermarked in each of his enigmatic renditions. His mellifluous dulcet renditions harmonising with his attention to infinitesimal Tagorean nuances breathed life into the songs he rendered. His golden baritone voice and his near perfect emotional delivery brought out the best that Tagore music had to offer to the listener; and yet he fastidiously stuck to the rigid notations set by Tagore, not once digressing from them in any of his magical renditions. Sagar Sen was the consummate minstrel who satisfied the puritans and yet popularised Tagorean music and brought it to the masses.

Sagar Sen has left behind a rich, musical legacy of contemporary Rabindrasangeet renditions through his hundred plus soundtracks recorded with the Megaphone, Columbia, EMI-HMV in several chartbusting albums traversing two and half decades. Apart from staging & conducting innumerable musical theatricals rendering various Tagorean operatic ballads, he has been an exemplary torchbearer in popularising Tagorean music not only through his singular contribution as a virtuoso artiste par excellence, but also through regular concerts & performances of various Tagorean thematic stage shows conceptualized, presented & conducted by him. Sagar Sen had pioneered the model of conceptualizing thematic stage shows & concerts, based solely on Tagorean music. Among his popular stage shows & concerts were Shrabon Sandhya (Monsoon Evening), Bishwajana Mohichhey (World Spellbound in Music), Gaaner Jharnatalaye (Under the Cascade of Songs), Swadeshi Naye Bideshi Kheya (Tagore songs from Western Tunes), Rituranga (Season’s Varieties); Shraban Sandhya was the most acclaimed. Through these thematic stage-show concerts organised at prestigious venues in Kolkata like Rabindra Sadan, Sisir Mancha and Kala Mandir, Sagar Sen provided a huge platform and reach for contemporary Tagorean artistes and danseuse to promote and showcase their talents. All his students from Rabi Rashmi performed choral songs whilst his contemporaries like the legendary Hemanta Mukhopadhyay, Debabrata Biswas, Suchitra Mitra,  Kanika Bandyopadhyay and many others performed solos in these concerts. Sagar Sen was a dynamic stage organiser and musical visionary far ahead of his times.

Although the legend of Sagar Sen revolves around his being an archetypal Rabindrasangeet singer, he was also an exemplary music mentor, organiser, music director, and a humanist. Through his countless charitable public performances Sagar Sen tirelessly contributed to social causes, especially to the West Bengal Chief Minister’s relief fund that was instituted to provide relief to the millions affected by the havoc of floods in Bengal during the decade of 70s. He was a larger-than-life humanitarian persona providing succour to many of his students and admirers; he was their mentor, their altruistic peer figure, their Sagarda.

In the mature years of his musical career, Sagar Sen started recording numerous Bengali modern songs, notably under the music directions of maestro composers Hemanta Mukherjee & Salil Chowdhury. The AIR archives have recordings of a number of Bengali modern songs sung by him. He performed as a playback artist notably in Bengali movies Je Jekhane Dariye (1974), Mantramugdha and Abirbhab (1979) amongst others. Sagar Sen music directed the Bengali movie Abirbhab; not known to many, Hemanta Mukherjee & Bhupen Hazarika have sung under his music direction. His renditions Ei Jibon Emni Kore Ar To Soy Na and Ki Holo Chand Keno Meghe Dheke Gelo, modern Bengali song tracks composed by Salil Chowdhury and recorded in 1980, were runaway hits.

Style 

His style of rendition appealed to every dedicated listener of the genre for its perfect blend of emotional delivery (which is a unique attribute of Rabindrasangeet) and technical perfection which succeeded in manifesting the subliminal nature of Rabindrasangeet melodies. Sagar Sen's incredibly unique understanding & spiritual insight of Tagore's songs has been invariably watermarked in each of his enigmatic renditions and his lingering, silken, magical renditions of Tagorean love songs highlights his genius through the mellow romantic intonations that unfailingly embellished the songs he sang. His uniqueness lay in the fact that he gave extreme importance to the minutest details of the notations and yet his renditions exhibited the best of freestyle singing. The legendary melodist ever and always watermarked his unique song style signature into the melodies of the songs he chose to interpret. His unique attributes like his melodious baritone voice, attention to the minute details and the most appropriate emotional delivery and style required for the rendition of songs composed by Rabindranath Tagore appealed to the masses on a large scale and yet kindled the connoisseur listener as well. His soulful midasque rendition transformed Tagorean songs into a golden melodic tapestry.

Modern songs and playback 

Sagar Sen performed as a playback artiste notably in the Bengali movies Je Jekhane Dnariye (1974), and Parichay (1979) and Mantramugdha, amongst others. He also music directed movies like Abirbhab. in which he was also one of the playback artiste. He received a BFJA Award in 1979 for the song 'Aj Jyotsnaratey Sobai Gechhe Boney' in the movie Parichay. He also sang modern Bengali songs like 'Ei Jibon Emni Kore Ar To Soy Na' and 'Ki Holo Chand Keno Meghe Dheke Gelo' in 1980 and a duet with Sabita Chowdhury 'Trishito Nayane Eso' all composed by the maestro composer, Salil Chowdhury.

Personal life and death 

In 1962, he married Sumita Sen. Pritam, his first son was born in 1964. His second son Priyam was born in 1966 and his youngest son Promit was born in 1967.

In 1981, he was diagnosed with cancer. Despite this diagnosis, he continued recording and performing in concerts in with full zest and vigour throughout the last one and a half years of his life. He died on 4 January 1983, at the age of 50.

He was survived by his wife and three sons,  Pritam Sen, Priyam Sen and Promit Sen.

Promit Sen is a Rabindrasangeet artiste in his own right and continues to perform in the present era.

References

External links 
 http://www.sagarsen.org
 itunes.apple.com
 
 new.music.yahoo.c
 apratim.in
 bangiyasanskritikparishad.com
 calcuttayellowpages.com
 hcidhaka.org
 theindependentbd.com

1932 births
1983 deaths
Rabindra Sangeet exponents
Rabindranath Tagore
Bengali singers
Bengali Hindus
20th-century Indian singers
Singers from Kolkata